Werner Mårtensson was a Swedish co-founder and chairman of the Swedish Association football club Malmö FF, a post he held between 1910 and 1913.

References

Swedish sports executives and administrators
Malmö FF chairmen